This is a list of notable commercial banks in Kenya

 Licensed commercial banks
 ABC Bank (Kenya)
 Absa Bank Kenya
 Access Bank Kenya
 Bank of Africa
 Bank of Baroda
 Bank of India
 Citibank
 Consolidated Bank of Kenya
 Cooperative Bank of Kenya
 Credit Bank
 Development Bank of Kenya
 Diamond Trust Bank
 Dubai Islamic Bank
 Ecobank Kenya
 Equity Bank Kenya
 Family Bank
 First Community Bank
 Guaranty Trust Bank Kenya
 Guardian Bank
 Gulf African Bank
 Habib Bank AG Zurich
 Housing Finance Company of Kenya
 I&M Bank
 Imperial Bank Kenya (In receivership)
 Kingdom Bank Limited
 Kenya Commercial Bank
 Mayfair Bank
 Middle East Bank Kenya
 M Oriental Bank
 National Bank of Kenya
 NCBA Bank Kenya
 Paramount Universal Bank
 Prime Bank (Kenya)
 SBM Bank Kenya
 Sidian Bank
 Spire Bank
 Stanbic Holdings Plc
 Standard Chartered Kenya
 United Bank for Africa
 Victoria Commercial Bank

 Representative offices of foreign banks
 HDFC Bank
 Nedbank
 FirstRand Bank
 Bank of China
 JP Morgan Chase
 Bank of Kigali
 Bank AL Habib
 Banque Misr

See also

 List of banks in Africa
 Central Bank of Kenya
 Economy of Kenya

References

External links
 CBK Revokes Chase Bank Licence, Kick Starts Winding Up As of 21 April 2021.
 Kenya: CBK Cancels Licence for Indian Bank's Kenya Office
 Central Bank of Kenya Names Liquidator for Dubai Bank - 24 August 2015
 Website of Central Bank of Kenya

 
Banks
Kenya
Kenya